Ta-Tanisha (born Edith Robinson) is an American character actress, best known for her role as Pam Simpson on the television series Room 222, which she played from 1970 to 1972.

Ta-Tanisha later appeared in the 1973 film The Sting, and appeared on Sanford and Son as "The Sanford Arms" tenant Janet Lawrence. Ta-Tanisha also appeared on Good Times three times (in three separate roles) as well as on What's Happening!!. Her husband is veteran actor Lee Weaver. Ta-Tanisha and Weaver. They have one daughter, Leisla

Career
Ta-Tanisha arrived in Los Angeles from Detroit, Michigan in the 1960s. In the early 1970s Ta-Tanisha began studying theatre at the Performing Arts Society Los Angeles (PASLA) where she performed in several plays including Blues for Mister Charlie and A Raisin in the Sun. Ta-Tanisha also appeared in The Black Girl in Search of God at the Mark Taper Forum.

After a while, Ta Tanisha began to get roles in television shows and films such as Room 222, in a recurring role as Pam Simpson, Good Times, Sanford & Son and the Mod Squad. She co-starred as a deaf mute on the hit show Mission: Impossible (1966 TV series) and was nominated for the NAACP Image Award for this performance. Ta-Tanisha was also in the Academy Award-winning movie, The Sting.

This exposure to the production process inspired Ta-Tanisha to create a Media literacy program for inner-city youth, Ta-Tanisha named this program TechniVision and it was presented at a local art center and as an after school program in conjunction with Los Angeles City Schools and Girls, Inc.

Ta-Tanisha received an award from the City of Los Angeles for “helping to heal the city” after the uprising of the early '90s in the city.

Currently Ta-Tanisha is part of the Repertory Dance Theater of Los Angeles and is part of a team that is conducting an after school performance program. Ta-Tanisha has also written a play about Biddy Mason, an enslaved African American woman who never learned to read or write; Miz Biddy. The play is currently in development.

Personal life
Since July 10, 1971, she has been married to actor Lee Weaver. They have one child, a daughter, Leisla.

Filmography

Film

Television film

Television Series

References

External links 
 

1953 births
Living people
African-American actresses
American television actresses
Actresses from New York City
American film actresses
People from the Bronx
21st-century African-American people
21st-century African-American women
20th-century African-American people
20th-century African-American women